Alachua may refer to:
 Alachua County, Florida, United States
 Alachua, Florida, a city in Alachua County, Florida
 Alachua culture, the archaeological designation of the Native American culture in north-central Florida, c. AD 700 to 1700
 Alachua Formation, a geological formation in Florida
 Alachua, a former genus of wasps in the family Eulophidae, presently a junior synonym of Horismenus

See also